C19 or C-19 may refer to:

Transportation
 , a member of the first group of five ships of the British Town-class light cruisers
 C-19 Alpha, designation of 3 modified Northrop Alpha Type 2 aircraft purchased by the US Army Air Corps in 1931
 Boeing C-19, a military designation for the Boeing 747-100 series of aircraft
 Cierva C.19, a 1929 autogyro built in England
 , a 1909 British C-class submarine
 Sauber C19, a 2000 racing car

Other uses
 19th century
 Iceberg C-19, an iceberg that broke off the Ross Ice Shelf in 2002 and which broke into two parts, C-19A ("Melting Bob") and C-19B, in 2003
 Caldwell 19 (IC 5146, the Cocoon Nebula), a reflection/emission nebula in the constellation Cygnus
 Carbon-19 (C-19 or 19C), an isotope of carbon
 IEC 60320 C19, an electrical power connector
 French Defence (Encyclopaedia of Chess Openings code)
 Malignant neoplasm of rectosigmoid junction (ICD-10 code); See Colorectal cancer
 Colt Canada C19 standard issue bolt-action rifle of the Canadian Rangers
 COVID-19, a disease
 COVID-19 pandemic
 C19: The Society of Nineteenth-Century Americanists, an academic organization